The Oak Hill Historic District is a historic district in the community of Oak Hill, Alabama, United States.  It was placed on the National Register of Historic Places on June 26, 1998.  The district is roughly centered on the intersection of AL 10 and AL 21.  It contains , 56 buildings, and 7 structures with the architectural styles ranging from mid-19th century revival to Victorian.

References

External links

National Register of Historic Places in Wilcox County, Alabama
Historic districts in Wilcox County, Alabama
Historic districts on the National Register of Historic Places in Alabama
Historic American Buildings Survey in Alabama